Vandana is a 1975 Indian film directed by Narendra Suri in Hindi language under the banner of N.K.R. Films. The film released on 31 December 1975 starring Parikshat Sahni, Sadhana, Sarika and Bindu.

Plot
An orphan girl, named Bindu is trapped in a web of deceit and crime that imprisons her in shackles. Expressive as in her other films, events take her through life's journey in a tale that is not quite regular Bombay potboiler. For one, there is a rare use of boats, the 28 metre Pamela (a cabin cruiser) and a couple of dinghies with outboards.

Cast
 Parikshit Sahni as Rakesh
 Sadhana as Rekha
 Sarika as Asha
 Bindu as Shobha
 Nazir Hussain as Jailor
 Narendranath as Badal
 Badri Prasad as Judge 1
 Murad as Judge 2
 Jankidas Mehra as moneylender
 Narmada Shankar as Pandit
 Durga Khote as Rakesh's Mother
 Krishnakant as Shobha's Uncle
 Praveen Paul as Lady Jailor
 Manmohan as Basant Kumar
 Jayshree T. as Sonia
 Jhonny Walker as John
 Mukri as Popatram

Soundtrack
The music was composed and penned by Ravi and released by Saregama.

References

External links
 
 Vandana (Film)
 Vandana (1975)

1975 films
1970s Hindi-language films
1975 drama films
Films scored by Ravi